Daniel Kamy Ntankeu Yves (born 8 March 1996) is a Cameroonian professional footballer who plays as a defender.

Early and personal life
Kamy was born in Yaoundé, Cameroon and raised in France. He holds dual Cameroonian-French nationality.

Club career
Kamy played youth football for French clubs Ulnay, L'Académie Épinay and L'Entente SSG. He began his senior career in Bosnia with Bosna Visoko.

Kamy moved from Montenegrin club Dečić to Finnish club Inter Turku in January 2018.

He was released by Olimpija Ljubljana on 1 February 2021.

International career
Kamy was a Cameroon U23 squad member at the 2017 Islamic Solidarity Games.

References

1996 births
Living people
Footballers from Yaoundé
Cameroonian footballers
French footballers
Association football defenders
Entente SSG players
NK Bosna Visoko players
FK Dečić players
FC Inter Turku players
NK Olimpija Ljubljana (2005) players
FK Inđija players
First League of the Federation of Bosnia and Herzegovina players
Montenegrin First League players
Veikkausliiga players
Slovenian PrvaLiga players
Serbian SuperLiga players
Cameroonian expatriate footballers
French expatriate footballers
Cameroonian expatriate sportspeople in France
Expatriate footballers in France
Expatriate footballers in Bosnia and Herzegovina
Cameroonian expatriate sportspeople in Montenegro
French expatriate sportspeople in Montenegro
Expatriate footballers in Montenegro
Cameroonian expatriate sportspeople in Finland
French expatriate sportspeople in Finland
Expatriate footballers in Finland
Cameroonian expatriate sportspeople in Slovenia
French expatriate sportspeople in Slovenia
Expatriate footballers in Slovenia
French expatriate sportspeople in Serbia
Expatriate footballers in Serbia